Chandni Chowk to China (shortened to CC2C) is a 2009 Indian Hindi-language action comedy film directed by Nikkhil Advani and stars Akshay Kumar and Deepika Padukone, with Mithun Chakraborty and Hong Kong action cinema actor Gordon Liu among the co-stars. In addition to being shot in China, many parts of the film were shot in Bangkok, Thailand, although some of the China scenes were shot in sets in the Shanghai Film Studio. The film revolves around a vegetable cutter from Chandni Chowk in Delhi who finds himself on an adventure in China after the residents of an oppressed village deem him to be the reincarnation of a slain Chinese revolutionary.

Distributed in the U.S. and co-produced by Warner Bros., it is the third Bollywood movie made and distributed in partnership with a major Hollywood studio, following Sony's Saawariya (2007) and Walt Disney Pictures' animated feature Roadside Romeo (2008). It is Warner Bros. Pictures' first Hindi film. Released on 16 January 2009, it was a flop at the box office.

Plot
The film begins with the story of The Great Wall of China and a war with a warrior Liu Sheng. It also shows the evil Hojo's tyranny in the village of Zhange after so many years.
Sidhesh Sharma aka Sidhu is a lowly vegetable cutter at a roadside food stall in the Chandni Chowk section of Delhi, who consults astrologers, tarot card readers, and fake fakirs despite his foster father Dada's exhortations. When two strangers from China claim him as a reincarnation of war hero 'Liu Sheng' and take him to China, Sidhu, encouraged by trickster Chopstick, believes he will be feted as a hero, unaware of his own recruitment to assassinate the smuggler Hojo.

Sidhu travels to China with Chopstick. Along the way, he meets Sakhi, the Indian-Chinese spokesmodel known as Ms. Tele Shoppers Media, or Ms. TSM, who also appears in China. Her twin sister Suzy, known as the femme fatale Meow Meow, works for Hojo, not knowing Hojo tried to kill her father, Inspector Chiang. Sidhu, through a series of accidents, initially eludes Hojo. However, Sidhu realizes the truth about his identity. Devastated, Sidhu apologizes to Hojo. Just then, Dada shows up and starts beating Hojo's men, Hojo kills Dada, and Sidhu is exposed as a loser. Also, he is beaten and urinated on by Hojo. Injured and disgraced, Sidhu vows revenge. Three months later, Sidhu encounters an amnesiac vagrant, whom he later identifies to Sakhi as Inspector Chiang. Chiang later recovers his memory and trains Sidhu in kung fu. When Hojo again meets with Sidhu, Suzy injures Chiang; but upon seeing Sakhi, betrays Hojo. Sidhu fights Hojo in single combat, eventually using a modified vegetable-cutting technique to overpower him. After a huge fight, Sidhu finally kills Hojo. In the aftermath, Sidhu opens a vegetable stall in China but is recruited to fight for some African pygmies.

Cast
 Akshay Kumar as Sidhesh "Sidhu" Sharma / Liu Sheng (dual role)
Deepika Padukone as Sakhi / Miss TSM and Suzy / Meow Meow (dual Role)
 Ranvir Shorey as Chopstick
 Mithun Chakraborty as Dada / Mr. Sharma (extended appearance)
 Roger Yuan as Police Inspector Chiang Kohung
 Gordon Liu as Hojo
 Kiran Juneja as Chiang's wife
 Kevin Wu as Frankie
 Conan Stevens as Joey

Production 
The film, earlier known as Mera Naam Chin Chin Choo and also Made in China, is written by Sridhar Raghavan.

Shooting began in January 2008 and included a schedule in China.

Release

Box office reception
Chandni Chowk to China earned  in its opening weekend. The film's total North American box office in the four weeks of running was $921,738, and total worldwide gross was $13,439,480.

Critical reception
  Claudia Puig of USA Today said, "This Indian/Chinese cinematic hybrid is likable and entertaining but overlong and occasionally hokey", and that Kumar's "physical humor brings to mind Jim Carrey". John Anderson of Variety wrote, "If Chandni Chowk to China were a person, it would need Valium", and found that "everything is fast and furious, hilarious, hysterical and frantic. Some of the sequences as are quite beautiful and, in the case of the dance numbers featuring Padukone, stunning. But it's the fight scenes as that truly take off". Frank Lovece of Newsday wrote, "Less a Bollywood bonbon than a pan-Asian fusion dish, this combination of Indian musical and Chinese chopsocky is, nonetheless, delicious fun".

Steven Rae of The Philadelphia Inquirer stated that, "Chandni Chowk is entertainingly goofy for about 30 minutes. And then, for the next two hours-plus, it's agony." Scott Tobias of The Onion described the film as "crass, schizophrenic, culturally insensitive, horribly paced, and shameless in its pandering to the lowest common denominator", while Owen Gleiberman of Entertainment Weekly said, "This galumphing elephant of a chopsocky revenge-of-the-nerd quasi-musical lacks the lyrical choreographic beauty that has marked such Stateside Bollywood releases as the gorgeous Lagaan". Michael Philips of the Chicago Tribune called the film "a massive and rather tiring showcase for Bollywood action hero Akshay Kumar". Indian critic Taran Adarsh gave the movie 1.5/5 stars, calling it "a big, big, big letdown". Rajeev Masand of IBN termed it a tiring watch, while praising Kumar's performance.

The film has received one award nomination, with Deepika Padukone being nominated for Best Actress at the 3rd Asian Film Awards held in March 2009.

Controversy
In Nepal, there were protests against the film due to a passing claim that Buddha was born in India; Lumbini, which is the birthplace of Buddha, is located in Nepal.

Several shows were cancelled in Nepal due to the protests. Protestors threatened to burn cinemas that screened the film, and racial slurs like "Dhoti" were hurled against Indians online.

The protests continued for several days, despite the Nepali distributor deleting the piece of narration that mentioned Buddha in the copies of the film shown in Nepal. On 22 January, Nepali cinemas stopped and banned screening Chandni Chowk to China.

In the aftermath of the Nepal controversy, actor Shekhar Suman criticised the film with some derogatory and rude comments. He also stated the movie is an amateurish attempt by Nikhil Advani, terming it as a "worst" film. Mostly, supporters of Kumar, especially Nikhil Advani stated that it was a publicity stunt to bring Suman's son Adhyayan in limelight for release of his film Raaz: The Mystery Continues. Suman replied to the claim that it was not a publicity act and the latter apologized to Kumar for it.

Music 

The music of Chandni Chowk to China was released on 2 December 2008. The album features composers as diverse as Shankar–Ehsaan–Loy, Kailash-Paresh-Naresh, Bappi Lahiri-Bappa Lahiri and Bohemia.

Reception
Joginder Tuteja of Bollywood Hungama.com rated it 3.5/5, claiming, "Chandni Chowk to China is clearly the next musical hit in the making."

References

External links 
 
 
 

2009 films
2000s Hindi-language films
Films scored by Bohemia
Films scored by Kailash Kher
Films scored by Shankar–Ehsaan–Loy
Kung fu films
Films scored by Bappi Lahiri
Films about reincarnation
Warner Bros. films
Indian action comedy films
Films set in Shanghai
2000s martial arts comedy films
Films directed by Nikkhil Advani
2009 martial arts films
2009 action comedy films
2009 comedy films
Films banned in Nepal
Orion Pictures films